Scott Pollard may refer to:

 Scot Pollard (born 1975), retired American basketball player
 Scott M. Pollard (born 1970), American member of the Rhode Island House of Representatives